Sarcotheca is a genus of plant in family Oxalidaceae.

Species include:
 Sarcotheca diversifolia, (Miq.) Hallier f.
 Sarcotheca glomerula, Veldkamp
 Sarcotheca monophylla, (Planch. ex Hk.f.) Hallier.f.
 Sarcotheca ochracea, Hallier f.

References

Sarcotheca Blume Plants of the World Online
Accepted species Plants of the World Online

 
Oxalidales genera
Taxonomy articles created by Polbot